The 2016–17 Hartford Hawks women's basketball team represented the University of Hartford during the 2016–17 NCAA Division I women's basketball season. The Hawks, led by first year head coach Kim McNeill, played their home games in the Chase Arena at Reich Family Pavilion and were members of the America East Conference. They finished the season 17–14, 7–9 in America East play to finish in sixth place. They advanced to the semifinals of the America East women's tournament where they lost to Albany.

Media
All home games and conference road games will stream on either ESPN3 or AmericaEast.tv. Most road games will stream on the opponents website. All games will be broadcast on the radio on WWUH.

Roster

Schedule

|-
!colspan=9 style="background:#; color:#FFFFFF;"| Non-conference regular season

|-
!colspan=9 style="background:#; color:#FFFFFF;"| America East regular season

|-
!colspan=9 style="background:#; color:#FFFFFF;"| America East Women's Tournament

See also
 2016–17 Hartford Hawks men's basketball team

References

Hartford Hawks women's basketball seasons
Hartford
Hartford Hawks women's b
Hartford Hawks women's b